The 2006 US Open began 28 August and finished on 10 September 2006.

Roger Federer was successful in defending his 2005 title, defeating 2003 champion Andy Roddick in the final. Kim Clijsters was unable to defend her title due to injury. 19-year-old Maria Sharapova won her second Grand Slam title, defeating Justine Henin-Hardenne in the final. It was Henin-Hardenne's third Grand Slam final loss of 2006, having lost the Australian Open and Wimbledon finals earlier in the year.

Seniors

Men's singles

 Roger Federer  defeated  Andy Roddick, 6–2, 4–6, 7–5, 6–1
It was Federer's 8th title of the year, and his 41st overall. It was his 9th career Grand Slam title, and his 3rd (consecutive) US Open title.

Women's singles

 Maria Sharapova defeated  Justine Henin-Hardenne, 6–4, 6–4
It was Sharapova's 3rd title of the year, and her 13th overall. It was her 2nd career Grand Slam title, and her 1st US Open title.

Men's doubles

 Martin Damm /  Leander Paes  defeated  Jonas Björkman /  Max Mirnyi, 6–7(5–7), 6–4, 6–3

Women's doubles

 Nathalie Dechy /  Vera Zvonareva defeated  Dinara Safina /  Katarina Srebotnik, 7–6(7–5), 7–5

Mixed doubles

 Martina Navratilova /  Bob Bryan defeated  Květa Peschke /  Martin Damm, 6–2, 6–3

Juniors

Boys' singles

 Dušan Lojda defeated  Peter Polansky 7-6(7–4), 6-3

Girls' singles

 Anastasia Pavlyuchenkova defeated  Tamira Paszek 3-6, 6-4, 7-5

Boys' doubles

 Jamie Hunt /  Nathaniel Schnugg defeated  Jarmere Jenkins/ Austin Krajicek 6-3, 6-3

Girls' doubles

 Mihaela Buzărnescu /  Ioana Raluca Olaru defeated  Sharon Fichman/ Anastasia Pavlyuchenkova 7-5, 6-2

Wheelchair

Men's wheelchair singles

 Robin Ammerlaan defeated  Michael Jeremiasz 6-7(1–7), 6-3, 7-5

Women's wheelchair singles

 Esther Vergeer defeated  Sharon Walraven 6-1, 6-2

Men's wheelchair doubles

 Robin Ammerlaan /  Michael Jeremiasz defeated  Shingo Kunieda /  Tadeusz Kruszelnicki 7-6(7–2), 6-1

Women's wheelchair doubles

 Jiske Griffioen /  Esther Vergeer defeated  Korie Homan /  Maaike Smit 6-4, 6-4

Seeds

Men's singles

Top 10 elimination

Withdrawn players

Men's Singles
  Mario Ančić → replaced by  Flávio Saretta
  Igor Andreev → replaced by  Jan Hernych
  Joachim Johansson → replaced by  Ramón Delgado
  Nicolas Kiefer → replaced by  Michael Berrer
  Radek Štěpánek → replaced by  Olivier Patience

Women's Singles
  Elena Bovina → replaced by  Conchita Martínez Granados
  Kim Clijsters → replaced by  Virginie Razzano
  Flavia Pennetta → replaced by  Nicole Pratt
  Venus Williams → replaced by  María José Martínez Sánchez

Player of the day
Day 1 -  Lindsay Davenport
Day 2 - No competition due to the rain.
Day 3 -  David Nalbandian
Day 4 -  Andre Agassi
Day 5 -  Martina Navratilova
Day 6 - No competition due to the rain.
Day 7 -  Serena Williams
Day 8 -  Jelena Janković
Day 9 - No competition due to the rain.
Day 10 -  Tommy Haas
Day 11 -  Nikolay Davydenko
Day 12 -  Maria Sharapova
Day 13 -  Andy Roddick
Day 14 -  Roger Federer

External links

Official website of US Open
Archived results on SI.com

 
 

 
US Open (tennis)
U.S. Open
US Open
2006
US Open
US Open
US Open